Tankaman District is in Nazarabad County, Alborz province, Iran. At the 2006 census, its population was 25,190, in 6,313 households, at which time its county was in Tehran province. The last census in 2016 counted 18,723 people in 5,800 households.

References 

Nazarabad County

Districts of Alborz Province

Populated places in Alborz Province

Populated places in Nazarabad County